The End of Alice is a 1996 novel by American writer A. M. Homes. It was published in the United States by Scribner and in the United Kingdom by Anchor Books.

The story is narrated mostly by a middle-aged pedophile and child killer who is serving a life sentence. He receives correspondence from a 19-year-old girl who plans to seduce a 12-year-old neighborhood boy. The child killer encourages her and gives her tips on seducing children. He delights in the girl's letters detailing her progress. The scenes involving the girl (who is never named) are written from a third-person perspective.

Plot summary
When the novel opens, a pedophile and child murderer – identified only as "Chappy" – has been in prison for 23 years. (He narrates most of the novel, including accounts of his treatment by his unstable, emotionally and sexually abusive mother.) Now in his 50s and with a parole hearing approaching, Chappy tells of receiving a letter from an unnamed 19-year-old girl who takes a morbid interest in his case. She tells him that she is on summer holiday from college and plans to seduce a 12-year-old boy named Matthew, who lives in her neighborhood.

As the girl corresponds with Chappy, he recounts his past, contrasting events in his life with the explicit details given by the girl of how she seduces Matthew. The boy is portrayed as typical, with many of the unattractive habits a 12-year-old can have, plus a few uniquely disgusting ones. Chappy encourages the girl, and she soon accomplishes her goal. First she gives Matthew tennis lessons. On another occasion, while caring for him as a sitter, she strips naked and gives him a quick hands-on lesson in feminine biology. The pair soon have sex and continue to do so on regular occasions.

Chappy eagerly reads the girl's letters as she describes her successes. He berates her for her poor grammar and for her liberal use of exclamation points. He recounts several scenes of prison sex.

During the novel, Chappy refers frequently to "Alice," his 12-year-old victim, with whom he had a sexual relationship. He provides more details about the girl only toward the end of the book. At the very end of the story, during his parole hearing, it is revealed that the convict brutally murdered and decapitated the girl after they argued. She blamed him for bleeding; it was the start of her period. He tried to explain to her what was happening to her, but she kept threatening to kill him, and he finally overpowered her.

The girl's "relationship" with Matthew ends when she goes to Europe for an end-of-summer trip. While traveling, she receives a letter from her parents, who have found a letter from the narrator and know what she has done; they write that she will need to "see someone" when she returns home.

Reception
The book generated significant controversy and received mixed reviews in the United States and even more so in the United Kingdom. It was criticized for its explicit scenes of child sexual abuse and prison rape, and for its sympathetic portrayal of two protagonists who believed that sex with minors was perfectly acceptable. Defenders of the book argued that, as it was written mostly from the perspective of the pedophiles, it needed to express their beliefs.

When the novel was published in the UK in 1997, representatives of the National Society For The Prevention Of Cruelty To Children complained about it and appealed to bookstores not to stock it. Only W. H. Smith observed this request. The NSPCC's spokesman, Jim Harding, described The End Of Alice as "the most vile and perverted novel I've ever read."

Randall Kenan of Elle magazine, wrote: "Homes manages — with language both lyrical and frighteningly direct — to usher the reader into the horrific landscape of a disturbed mind and, at the same time, of a funny, vulnerable, ultimately very sad human being." 

The Barcelona Review said this is a novel that "rings true from beginning to end, that adds real insight into its characters and their worlds, that crawls under the skin, disturbs, digs at the reader's own psyche, and pushes him into a new position in the author-reader relationship."

Footnotes

External links
Jill Adams, "An Interview with A. M. Homes", The Barcelona Review, June/July 2007, #58/59
Excerpt and reviews, A.M. Homes Books website

1996 American novels
Fiction with unreliable narrators
Obscenity controversies in literature
Pedophilia in literature
Novels about child sexual abuse
Charles Scribner's Sons books
Anchor Books books